Halifax Pride is an LGBT pride festival, held annually in Halifax, Nova Scotia, Canada. It is the largest 2SLGBTQ+ event in Atlantic Canada, and one of the largest 2SLGBTQ+ pride events in Canada.

First held in 1988, the inaugural event featured just 75 marchers, some of whom wore paper bags over their heads due to the stigma against being openly identified as LGBT. The 2014 event featured approximately 2,500 marchers, with 80,000 people in attendance as participants or spectators.

The event's grand marshal in 2014 was Scott Jones, an LGBT activist from New Glasgow who launched the Don't Be Afraid campaign of LGBT awareness after being left paraplegic by an anti-gay attack in 2013. The event also featured a commemoration of Raymond Taavel, a former chair of the event who was killed in a violent attack in 2012.

The 2014 parade route started on Upper Water Street, and followed Barrington Street, Spring Garden Road and South Park Street to the Garrison Grounds at Citadel Hill.

In 2011, co-chair Ed Savage created some controversy by describing the event as "less promiscuous" and more family-oriented than other Pride festivals across Canada.

References

External links

 

Pride parades in Canada
Festivals in Halifax, Nova Scotia
Recurring events established in 1988
1988 establishments in Nova Scotia
LGBT in Nova Scotia